The 2018 Rhode Island Rams football team represented the University of Rhode Island in the 2018 NCAA Division I FCS football season. They were led by fifth-year head coach Jim Fleming and played their home games at Meade Stadium. They were a member of the Colonial Athletic Association. They finished the season 6–5, 4–4 in CAA play to finish in seventh place.

Previous season
The Rams finished the 2017 season 3–8, 2–6 in CAA play to finish in a tie for tenth place.

Preseason

CAA Poll
In the CAA preseason poll released on July 24, 2018, the Rams were predicted to finish in last place.

Preseason All-CAA Team
The Rams had two players selected to the preseason all-CAA team.

Offense

Aaron Parker – WR

Defense

Brandon Ginnetti – DL

Schedule

Game summaries

at Delaware

Albany

at UConn

at Harvard

Brown

Maine

at Stony Brook

William & Mary

at Elon

at James Madison

New Hampshire

Ranking movements

References

Rhode Island
Rhode Island Rams football seasons
Rhode Island Rams football